Sasakina is a genus of air-breathing land snails, terrestrial pulmonate gastropod mollusks in the family Dyakiidae.

Species 
The genus Sasakina includes:
 Sasakina bicincta B. Rensch, 1933
 Sasakina oxyconus (E. von Martens, 1896)- type species
 Sasakina perinsignis (E. A. Smith, 1898)
 Sasakina plesseni B. Rensch, 1938
 Sasakina vitrinolactea (B. Rensch, 1930)

References

Dyakiidae